Graminicola is a genus of  passerine birds in the family Pellorneidae.

Species
The genus contains the following species:

References

 
Pellorneidae
Bird genera
Taxonomy articles created by Polbot